"Shame" is a song by American singer Tyrese. It features background vocals from fellow American singer Jennifer Hudson. It was released on April 28, 2015 as the second single off his sixth studio album Black Rose, on the record label Voltron Recordz. The song contains an interpolation of Atlantic Starr's 1980 hit "Send For Me". "Shame" was nominated for Best Traditional R&B Performance and Best R&B Song at the 58th Grammy Awards.

Track listing
Digital download
"Shame" — 5:11

Music video 

The music video was produced by Denzel Washington and directed by Paul Hunter. This is Tyrese's second time working with the director, as Hunter previously directed the music video for "Signs Of Love Makin'" from his 2002 album I Wanna Go There.

Personnel
Credits adapted from Black Rose liner notes.
 Tyrese – lead vocals, producer
 Jennifer Hudson – background vocals
 Mika Lett – background vocals
 Warryn Campbell – producer, instrumentation
 Wah Wah Watson – guitar
 Richard Furch – mixing, recording

Chart performance

References

2015 singles
Tyrese Gibson songs
American rhythm and blues songs
Songs written by Tyrese Gibson
2015 songs
Songs written by Warryn Campbell
Song recordings produced by Warryn Campbell
Songs written by Ron Kersey
Songs written by Sam Dees